In agriculture mulch tillage or mulch-till fall under the umbrella term of conservation tillage in the United States and refer to seeding methods where a hundred percent of the soil surface is disturbed by tillage whereby crop residues are mixed with the soil and a certain amount of residues remain on the soil surface. A great variety of cultivator implements are used to perform mulch-till. 

Mulch is material to regulate heat.  This is done by covering it with any material like wood chips, straw, leaves or food waste.

References

Further reading
 Mulch-till – High Intensity Residue and Tillage Management – Irrigated Cropland, USDA – NRCS Conservation Practice Job Sheet ID- 345, JS- 19
 USDA – NRCS Tillage Practice Guide
 USDA – NRCS Residue Management Mulch-till, Alabama Guide Sheet AL 329B
 USDA – NRCS Residue Management Mulch-till, Conservation Practice Job Sheet PA345

External links

Sustainable agriculture